Aruna Raaga is a 1986 Indian Kannada-language action drama film, starring Anant Nag and Geetha. It was directed by K. V. Jayaram and is based on the novel of the same name, written by Rekha Kakhandaki. It was produced by Jayadurga Films.

Plot 
Janaki and Sumesh are married, however Sumesh is emotionally abusive. Sumesh (a doctor) has to go to America for work, and falsely promises to Janaki that she would join him in a few months. Time goes by and Janaki falls into depression, staying with her kind in-laws. Her mother dies, and her father requests that she live with him. Janaki, tired of not doing anything, decides to be a doctor.

Cast
 Anant Nag as Sumesh 
 Geetha as Janaki/Jahnavi
 K. S. Ashwath as Sumesh's father 
 Loknath as Janaki's father 
 Pandari Bai as Sumesh's mother 
 Sundar Krishna Urs as Devobhava 
 Umesh Navale as Rajesh: Sumesh's brother 
 Satyajeet as Sumesh's friend 
 Sudha Narasimharaju her first appearance
 Dingri Nagaraj 
 C. P. Yogishwar

Soundtrack
All the songs are composed and scored by M. Ranga Rao.

Awards
 Karnataka State Film Award for Best Actress - Geetha

References

1986 films
1980s Kannada-language films
Films scored by M. Ranga Rao
Films based on Indian novels